The River Tour was a concert tour by Bruce Springsteen and the E Street Band in support of Springsteen's 2015  The Ties That Bind: The River Collection box set and in celebration of the 35th anniversary of Springsteen's 1980 album, The River. The River Tour 2016 ended in September 2016. Subsequently, the Summer '17 tour in Australia and New Zealand continued the tour using the same promotional image from the original legs.

The River 2016 Tour was the top grossing worldwide tour of 2016, pulling in $268.3 million globally, and was the highest-grossing tour since 2014 for any artist. Springsteen and the E Street Band also hold the biggest boxscore for 2016, with the May 27 and 29 shows at Dublin's Croke Park taking in $19,228,100 from 160,188 attendance for two sellout shows.

The tour marked the first tour in two years for Springsteen and the E Street Band. All shows on the first North American leg of tour and some shows from the second leg featured a full-length sequential performance of The River album. Other shows featured a large part of the album, albeit not always in album order. Many of the shows lasted over three and a half hours with around 33 songs performed. Springsteen's show on September 7, 2016, at Citizens Bank Park in Philadelphia clocked in at 4 hours and 4 minutes, his longest show in the United States and the second-longest ever in his career, at two minutes shy of his 2012 show in Helsinki.

Background
The original River Tour began in October 1980 and continued through September 1981. With sets that regularly approached the four-hour range, the 140-date international tour firmly established a reputation for Bruce Springsteen and the E Street Band as marathon performers. 

Springsteen released The Ties That Bind: The River Collection on December 4, 2015. The box set features the original 1980 The River album along with many outtakes from the album's sessions. 

The tour was announced on December 4, 2015, with tickets going on sale seven days later. It came unexpectedly, as Springsteen was working on a new solo album and planned to tour in support of that. However, with it already having been two years since his last tour with the E Street Band, Springsteen chose not to delay the next band tour even further. In November 2015, Springsteen's manager, Jon Landau, suggested performing The River at a few small shows in New York City and Los Angeles; however, Springsteen said it would take too long to rehearse and suggested doing twenty shows. Drummer Max Weinberg said he got the call from Springsteen on Thanksgiving, a week before the tour was announced to the public. "In all of my professional engagements, I have what I call the Springsteen Clause. It's inviolate. It's my own version of force majeure. It's an act of God or Bruce Springsteen. And it works all the time," Weinberg said. Nils Lofgren had to change dates on his solo tour, while Gary Tallent had to postpone his.

This was the first Springsteen tour in which all dates featured the same album performed in its entirety. Unlike the previous few tours, the touring lineup was downsized and did not feature a full horn section or backing vocalists. "I knew the basis of the show was going to be The River, and that was a small rock group. The tighter lineup feels much more like the old days", Springsteen said. Like previous tours, Patti Scialfa was not present at every show due to her responsibilities as a mother supporting her daughter in her equestrian career. Due to Scialfa's not being present at every show, along with no choir, Garry Tallent, standing in her spot on stage, sang backup vocals on a consistent basis on the front line.

Itinerary

North American leg 1
The tour got underway in Pittsburgh on January 16, 2016. Each show kicked off with "Meet Me in the City", followed by the full album performance of The River, and concluding with a twelve-song set featuring songs from the rest of Springsteen's catalog. The show usually finished with a cover of the Isley Brothers' "Shout". The show scheduled for January 24, 2016, at Madison Square Garden was postponed due to a record-setting snowstorm that hit the East Coast. The show was rescheduled for March 28. On April 23, 2016, at the first of two Brooklyn shows to end the first leg of the tour, Springsteen said that Brooklyn would mark "the last two nights we're officially playing The River from start to finish". That night he opened with "Purple Rain" in tribute to Prince, who had just died.

European leg
On July 13, 2016, for the first time since the end of the first North American leg of the tour, The River was performed in its entirety.

North American leg 2
Springsteen and the E Street Band kicked off the second North American leg of the tour on August 23, 2016, in East Rutherford, New Jersey, at MetLife Stadium. The show opened with a performance of "New York City Serenade"; that song became the opener for all shows on this leg of the tour. The final MetLife Stadium performance on August 30 clocked in at over 4 hours and opened with a run of nine original songs written in 1973 or earlier, plus early live favorites Summertime Blues and Pretty Flamingo. The practice of playing a string of tracks from Greetings from Asbury Park, N.J., and The Wild, the Innocent, and the E Street Shuffle continued throughout the rest of this leg.

The show on September 3, 2016, in Virginia Beach was postponed until September 5, 2016, due to inclement weather. On September 7, 2016, at Citizens Bank Park in Philadelphia, Springsteen played for 4 hours and 4 minutes, his longest show in the United States and second-longest ever. Springsteen performed in Pittsburgh, Pennsylvania, on September 11, 2016, the 15th anniversary of the 9/11 terrorist attacks. The show featured six songs from Springsteen's 9/11 inspired album, The Rising. Springsteen wrapped up The River Tour 2016 on September 14, 2016, in Foxborough, Massachusetts.

Oceania leg / Summer '17 Tour
On September 12, 2016, a fourth leg of the tour was announced that included nine shows in Australia and New Zealand in early 2017, named Summer '17 but using the same promotional artwork as the 2016 tour. 

Springsteen's concert in Christchurch on February 21, 2017, fell on the eve of the anniversary of the earthquake which devastated the city's center. In the weeks that followed the quake, Springsteen's song "My City of Ruins" was adopted by Christchurch as an unofficial anthem. Springsteen played the song during the concert, dedicating it to the people of the city.

Record-breaking shows
Springsteen has been known for lengthy shows, and this tour continued that trend. The show on September 7, 2016, at Citizens Bank Park in Philadelphia, ran 4 hours and 4 minutes, which stands as Springsteen's longest show in the United States and second-longest ever after a 2012 show in Helsinki that ran two minutes longer.

Ticket scalping
As with previous Springsteen tours, ticket scalpers were a major problem when it came to buying tickets. Tickets for Springsteen's New York City shows began popping up on resale sites such as StubHub and eBay on December 7, 2015, four days before they went on sale to the public. Scalpers were re-selling tickets not yet available for as much as $5,000. This prompted New York Attorney General Eric Schneiderman to launch an investigation into how this happened and to write a letter demanding that both companies immediately remove any listings for ticket sales. When tickets finally went on sale on December 11, many fans again were shut out from buying tickets as most venues sold out quickly; within minutes, tickets were appearing for hundreds to thousands of dollars more on resale sites. According to reports, Springsteen's shows sold out in record time. Springsteen's show in Newark, New Jersey, at the Prudential Center sold out in a few minutes. His previous 2012 show at the same venue took two hours to sell out.

Recordings
All shows were professionally recorded and released on live.brucespringsteen.net. Many were also featured on E Street Radio.

Set list
This set list is representative of the average setlist of the tour's first North American leg as conducted by Setlist.fm, which represents all concerts for the duration of the tour's first leg. The full album performance was dropped following the first leg, although it was resurrected for a few shows on the second leg of the tour.

 "Meet Me in the City"
The River
"The Ties That Bind"
 "Sherry Darling"
 "Jackson Cage"
 "Two Hearts"
 "Independence Day"
 "Hungry Heart"
 "Out in the Street"
 "Crush on You"
 "You Can Look (But You Better Not Touch)"
 "I Wanna Marry You"
 "The River"
 "Point Blank"
 "Cadillac Ranch"
 "I'm a Rocker"
 "Fade Away"
 "Stolen Car"
 "Ramrod"
 "The Price You Pay"
 "Drive All Night"
 "Wreck on the Highway"
Post-River
"Badlands"
 "Lonesome Day" 
 "No Surrender"
 "She's the One"
 "Because the Night"
 "The Rising"
 "Thunder Road"
Encore
"Born to Run"
 "Dancing in the Dark"
 "Rosalita (Come Out Tonight)"
 "Tenth Avenue Freeze-Out" 
 "Bobby Jean"
 "Shout" (The Isley Brothers cover)

Tour dates

N/A

Cancelled/postponed shows
On April 8, 2016, Springsteen announced on his website that he was cancelling his concert, two days later, at the Greensboro Coliseum in North Carolina, in protest of the state legislature's new law, the HB2 (nicknamed the "Bathroom Bill"), which banned transgender people from using public restrooms of the gender with which they identify and overturned local laws that ban employers from discriminating against certain workers. "Some things are more important than a rock show", he remarked. Springsteen was forced to postpone his concert on September 3, 2016, in Virginia Beach due to inclement weather from Hurricane Hermine. The show was rescheduled for two days later.

Songs performed

Personnel

The E Street Band
Bruce Springsteen – lead vocals, lead guitar, rhythm guitar, acoustic guitar, harmonica 
Roy Bittan – piano, synthesizer, accordion
Nils Lofgren – rhythm guitar, lead guitar, pedal steel guitar, acoustic guitar, background vocals
Patti Scialfa – background vocals, some duet vocals, acoustic guitar, tambourine (only appeared at selected shows throughout the tour)
Garry Tallent – bass guitar, background vocals
Steven Van Zandt – rhythm guitar, lead guitar, background vocals 
Max Weinberg – drums

with
Jake Clemons – saxophone, percussion, background vocals
Soozie Tyrell – violin, acoustic guitar, percussion, background vocals
Charles Giordano – organ, accordion, electronic glockenspiel

and

Sam Bardfeld string section – strings on "New York City Serenade" and "Jack of All Trades"

Guest appearances
Peter Wolf – provided vocals on "Shout" at shows in Boston on February 4, 2016, and Foxborough on September 14.
Joe Grushecky and Johnny Grushecky – provided vocals on "Born to Run" during the show in Cleveland on February 23, 2016, and on "Light of Day" in Pittsburgh on September 11.
Eddie Vedder – provided vocals on  "Bobby Jean" in Seattle on March 24, 2016.
Bob Seger – provided vocals on  "Tenth Avenue Freeze-Out" and "Shout" during the show in Detroit on April 14, 2016.
Bono – provided vocals on  "Because the Night" during the show in Dublin on May 29, 2016.
Elliott Murphy – played guitar on "Born to Run" in Paris on July 11, 2016.
Tom Morello – played guitar on "Death to My Hometown", "American Skin (41 Shots)", "Badlands" and played guitar and provided co-lead vocals on "The Ghost of Tom Joad" during the show in East Rutherford on August 25, 2016.
Rickie Lee Jones – provided vocals on "Spirit in the Night" in East Rutherford on August 30, 2016.
Vini Lopez – performed "It's Hard to Be a Saint in the City" and "Spirit in the Night" in Philadelphia on September 9, 2016.
Richie Sambora – performed on "Tenth Avenue Freeze-Out" and "Shout" in Adelaide on January 30, 2017

Opening acts
Counting Crows – (July 7, 2016)
Jet – (Feb. 2, 2017; Feb. 11, 2017; Feb. 18, 2017; Feb. 21, 2017; Feb. 25, 2017)
Diesel – (Feb. 11, 2017; Feb. 18, 2017)
Marlon Williams and the Yarra Benders – (Feb. 21, 2017; Feb. 25, 2017)

See also 
 List of highest-grossing concert tours

References

External links
 Bruce Springsteen (Official Site)
 Backstreets.com Tour Info & Setlists
 Brucetapes.com Concert specials from the River Tour

Bruce Springsteen concert tours
2016 concert tours
2017 concert tours